Darbari in Iran may refer to:
Darbari-ye Dam-e Abbas
Darbari-ye Jowkar
Darbari-ye Mohammad Hoseyn Zilayi